A memorial hall is a hall built as a memorial, typically to those who have lost their lives in war.

Memorial Hall  may also refer to:

United Kingdom 
 Congregational Memorial Hall, London
 Memorial Hall, Manchester
 Queen Victoria Memorial Hall, Coaltown of Balgonie
 Workingman's Institute and Memorial Hall, Newbridge

United States 
Arkansas
 Memorial Hall (University of Arkansas) in Fayetteville, listed on the U.S. National Register of Historic Places (NRHP)

Connecticut
 Memorial Hall (Windsor Locks, Connecticut), NRHP-listed

Delaware
 Memorial Hall (Delaware State) in Dover
 Memorial Hall (Newark, Delaware), NRHP-listed

Georgia
 Memorial Hall (University of Georgia) in Athens

Illinois
 Memorial Hall (Richmond, Illinois), NRHP-listed
 Memorial Hall (Rockford, Illinois)

Indiana
 Porter County Memorial Opera Hall, NRHP-listed

Kansas
 Memorial Hall (Independence, Kansas), NRHP-listed in Montgomery County
 Memorial Hall (Kansas City, Kansas)

Kentucky
 Memorial Hall (University of Kentucky) in Lexington

Maine
 Memorial Hall (Oakland, Maine), NRHP-listed

Maryland
 Memorial Hall (United States Naval Academy), in Annapolis

Massachusetts
 Memorial Hall (Dedham, Massachusetts)
 Memorial Hall (Foxborough, Massachusetts), NRHP-listed
 Memorial Hall (Harvard University), Cambridge, NRHP-listed
 Memorial Hall (Milford, Massachusetts), NRHP-listed
 Memorial Hall (Plymouth, Massachusetts)
 Memorial Hall (University of Massachusetts Amherst)
 Memorial Hall Library, Andover, NRHP-listed
 Memorial Hall Museum, Deerfield

Mississippi
 Memorial Hall (Natchez, Mississippi), or United States Courthouse, NRHP-listed and a Mississippi Landmark

North Carolina
 UNC Memorial Hall, Chapel Hill

Ohio
 Circleville Memorial Hall, NRHP-listed
 Dayton Memorial Hall, NRHP-listed
 Franklin County Memorial Hall in Columbus
 Memorial Hall (Cincinnati, Ohio) or Hamilton County Memorial Building, NRHP-listed
 Memorial Hall (University of Akron)

Pennsylvania
 Memorial Hall (Muhlenberg College), the indoor arena of the Muhlenberg Mules of Muhlenberg College in Allentown, Pennsylvania
 Memorial Hall (Philadelphia), NRHP-listed

South Carolina
 Memorial Hall, Coker University, in Hartsville, NRHP-listed

Tennessee
 Alumni Hall (Vanderbilt University), or Alumni Memorial Hall, Nashville, NRHP-listed
 Memorial Hall, Cumberland University, Lebanon, Tennessee, NRHP-listed in Wilson County
 Memorial Hall, Vanderbilt University, Nashville

Wisconsin
 Memorial Hall (Racine, Wisconsin), NRHP-listed
 Memorial Hall (Ashland, Wisconsin), NRHP-listed in Ashland County

See also
 Confederate Memorial Hall (disambiguation)
 Memorial Building (disambiguation)
 Memorial Hall station (disambiguation)